The borate bromides are mixed anion compounds that contain borate and bromide anions. They are in the borate halide family of compounds which also includes borate fluorides, borate chlorides, and borate iodides.

List

References

Borates
Bromides
Mixed anion compounds